Following the 1957 legislative elections, incumbent Bombay State chief minister Yashwantrao Chavan was sworn in for the second time in April 1957. Chavan served until 30 April 1960, when the State was dissolved and divided into the states of Maharashtra and Gujarat. After dissolution, Chavan continued as the chief minister of Maharashtra.

Ministry
The initial ministry consisted of 15 cabinet ministers.

References

Indian National Congress
C
C
Cabinets established in 1957
Cabinets disestablished in 1960
Bombay State